Inoke Breckterfield [ee-NO-kay] (born April 25, 1977) is an American football coach who is currently the defensive line coach at the University of Washington. He played in the Canadian Football League (CFL) for the Toronto Argonauts (1999–2000) and Winnipeg Blue Bombers (2001–2003). He was an All-American defensive end at Oregon State University in 1998.

Early life and family
Breckterfield attended Damien Memorial High School in Honolulu where he was a standout football player and track performer in the shot put. He graduated from Damien High in 1995. He is of Fijian, I-Kiribati, German, Samoan and Rotuman descent. His parents are both from Fiji. He is Paul Manueli's grand-nephew, Breckterfield's grandfather is Paul Manueli's older sibling. He and his wife, Carol, have three sons. Kalevi, is the oldest, and he played football at Cardinal Wuerl North Catholic and now plays for the Madison Edgewood Crusaders. And twin boys, Rocky and Riley. Carol played soccer for University of Southern California (USC) from 1996 to 1998, where she also was an all-conference selection.

Playing career

College
Breckterfield played for Oregon State in the fall of 1995.  In his time at Oregon State, he made a name for himself as a dominant defensive end in the Pac-10.  Breckterfield was named a third-team All-American in 1998 after being named first team All-Pac-10 Conference.  He was also the recipient of the prestigious Morris Trophy, awarded annually to the conference's top defensive lineman.  He was selected to play in the Hula Bowl his senior season as well.  Breckterfield finished his OSU career as the leader for tackles-for-loss (55.5) and sacks (19.5).  He currently ranks second in both.

Professional
After his time with the Beavers, Breckterfield had a successful Canadian Football League career with the Toronto Argonauts (1999–2000) and Winnipeg Blue Bombers (2001–03).

Coaching career
Breckterfield was the defensive line coach at the University of Wisconsin–Madison and was previously a defensive line coach at the University of Pittsburgh. He was also an assistant coach at the University of California, Los Angeles (UCLA) and before that at University of Montana. Before moving to Montana he was an assistant coach at Weber State University and a graduate assistant coach for Oregon State University with his former coach, Mike Riley during the 2007 and 2008 seasons.

Vanderbilt
Brechterfield joined Clark Lea's inaugural staff at Vanderbilt for the 2021 season.

Washington
In December 2021, it was announced that Breckterfield would be leaving Vanderbilt after one season to take the same role at the University of Washington.

References

External links
 Washington profile

1977 births
Living people
American football defensive ends
Canadian football defensive linemen
Montana Grizzlies football coaches
Oregon State Beavers football players
Pittsburgh Panthers football coaches
Toronto Argonauts players
UCLA Bruins football coaches
Vanderbilt Commodores football coaches
Washington Huskies football coaches
Weber State Wildcats football coaches
Winnipeg Blue Bombers players
Wisconsin Badgers football coaches
Coaches of American football from Hawaii
Players of American football from Honolulu
American players of Canadian football
American people of i-Kiribati descent
American people of I-Taukei Fijian descent
American people of German descent
American people of Rotuman descent
American sportspeople of Samoan descent